Joseph Bartholomew Young (June 10, 1857 – April 6, 1938) was a professional baseball pitcher. He appeared in one game in Major League Baseball for the St. Louis Browns on June 10, 1892, his 35th birthday. 

He was born in Pottsville, Pennsylvania and died in Shamokin, Pennsylvania of Stomach Cancer in 1938.

References

External links

St. Louis Browns (NL) players
Mt. Carmel (minor league baseball) players
19th-century baseball players
Baseball players from Pennsylvania
Sportspeople from Pottsville, Pennsylvania
1857 births
1938 deaths
Shamokin Maroons players